University B.T. & Evening College is an undergraduate, co-educational college situated in Cooch Behar, West Bengal. It was established in 1968 and offers Bachelor of Arts (B.A.) degrees and Bachelor of Education (B.Ed) degrees. The college is affiliated with the University of North Bengal and accredited as B by NAAC.

History
The college was started as a teacher's training institute as a constituent college of University of North Bengal in 1968 under the guidance of then Vice-Chancellor Prof. A.C. Roy. It was started from Cooch Behar Ucchcha Madhyamik Vidaylaya at Madan Mohan Colony, Kalighat Road. The college was shifted to the present site in 1972 on rent. Later on, the land and buildings were handed over to the college. Later degree courses were started in the evening to help the working students. However, keeping with the modern trends, all the courses are conducted during day.

Courses offered
B.A. (General & Hons): Honours: Bengali, English, Geography
B.Com (General & Honours): Honours: Accountancy
B.Ed: Bengali, English History, Mathematics, Geography, Physics, Chemistry and Biology

See also

References

External links
University B.T. & Evening College

Arts colleges in India
Universities and colleges in Cooch Behar district
Colleges affiliated to Cooch Behar Panchanan Barma University
Academic institutions formerly affiliated with the University of North Bengal
Educational institutions established in 1968
1968 establishments in West Bengal